This is a list of flags used by South Korea, North Korea, and their predecessor states.

Korean reunification flag

National

Political flags

North Korean government

South Korean government

Military

Korea

North Korea

South Korea

See also

 List of North Korean flags
 List of South Korean flags

References

Lists and galleries of flags
Flags
Flags
List